Laketown Township is a township in Carver County, Minnesota, United States. The population was 2,331 as of the 2000 census.

History
Laketown Township organized in 1858, and was named for its numerous small lakes.

Geography

The west edge of the city of Chaska and the west half of the city of Victoria are located within the township geographically but are separate entities.

Township 116 North, Range 24 West, Fifth Principal Meridian of the Public Land Survey System.

Lakes
 Lake Auburn (west quarter)
 Lake Waconia (east quarter)
 Lunstein Lake
 Marsh Lake
 Mud Lake
 Parley Lake
 Piersons Lake
 Reitz Lake
 Turbid Lake
 Wasserman Lake (west three-quarters)
 Lake Bavaria (southern half)

Adjacent townships
 Dahlgren Township (south)
 Benton Township (southwest)
 Waconia Township (west)
 Watertown Township (northwest)

Unincorporated community
 Coney Island

Major highway
  Minnesota State Highway 5

Cemeteries
The township contains Scandia Cemetery.

Demographics

As of the census of 2000, there were 2,331 people, 637 households, and 545 families residing in the township. There were 665 housing units at an average density of 24.0/sq mi (9.3/km). The racial makeup of the township was 96.48% White, 0.64% African American, 0.09% Native American, 1.80% Asian, 0.26% Pacific Islander, 0.09% from other races, and 0.64% from two or more races. Hispanic or Latino of any race were 0.90% of the population.

There were 637 households, out of which 42.4% had children under the age of 18 living with them, 80.7% were married couples living together, 2.4% had a female householder with no husband present, and 14.4% were non-families. 11.1% of all households were made up of individuals, and 3.9% had someone living alone who was 65 years of age or older. The average household size was 2.92 and the average family size was 3.17.

In the township the population was spread out, with 23.2% under the age of 18, 21.4% from 18 to 24, 24.9% from 25 to 44, 24.3% from 45 to 64, and 6.3% who were 65 years of age or older. The median age was 32 years. For every 100 females, there were 100.3 males. For every 100 females age 18 and over, there were 100.6 males.

The median income for a household in the township was $75,000, and the median income for a family was $78,577. Males had a median income of $50,349 versus $29,167 for females. The per capita income for the township was $27,543.  About 1.5% of families and 1.8% of the population were below the poverty line, including none of those under age 18 and 3.5% of those age 65 or over.

Politics

References
 Township Website
 United States National Atlas
 United States Census Bureau 2007 TIGER/Line Shapefiles
 United States Board on Geographic Names (GNIS)

Townships in Carver County, Minnesota
Townships in Minnesota